Chemical castration is castration via anaphrodisiac drugs, whether to reduce libido and sexual activity, to treat cancer, or otherwise. Unlike surgical castration, where the gonads are removed through an incision in the body, chemical castration does not remove organs, nor is it a form of sterilization. Chemical castration is generally reversible when treatment is discontinued, although permanent effects in body chemistry can sometimes be seen, as in the case of bone density loss increasing with length of use of depot medroxyprogesterone acetate (DMPA).

In May 2016, The New York Times reported that a number of countries use chemical castration on sex offenders, often in return for reduced sentences.

Effects

On males
When used on males, these drugs can reduce sex drive, sexual fantasies, and capacity for sexual arousal. Life-threatening side effects are rare, but some users show increases in body fat and reduced bone density, which increase long-term risk of cardiovascular disease and osteoporosis, respectively. Males may also experience gynecomastia (development of larger-than-normal mammary glands in males); full development is less common unless chemical castration is combined with feminizing oestrogen therapy.

On females

When used on females, the effects are similar, though there is little research about chemically lowering female's sex drive or female-specific anaphrodisiacs, since most research focuses on the opposite, but anti-androgenic hormone regimens would lower testosterone in females which can impact sex drive or sexual response. These drugs also deflate the breast glands and expand the size of the nipple. Also seen is a sudden shrinking in bone mass and discoloration of the lips, reduced body hair, and muscle mass.

Treatment for sex offenders
The first use of chemical castration occurred in 1944, when diethylstilbestrol was used with the purpose of lowering men's testosterone.
The antipsychotic agent benperidol was sometimes used to decrease sexual urges in people who displayed what was thought of as inappropriate sexual behavior, and as likewise given by depot injection, though benperidol does not affect testosterone and is therefore not a castration agent.
Chemical castration was often seen as an easier alternative to life imprisonment or the death penalty because it allowed the release of the convicted.

In 1981, in an experiment by Pierre Gagné, 48 males with long-standing histories of sexually deviant behaviour were given medroxyprogesterone acetate for as long as 12 months. Forty of those subjects were recorded as having diminished desires for deviant sexual behaviour, as well as less frequent sexual fantasies and greater control over sexual urges. The research recorded a continuation of this improved behaviour after the administration of the drug had ended, with no evidence of adverse side effects, and so recommended medroxyprogesterone acetate along with counselling as a successful method of treatment for serial sex offenders.

Leuprolide acetate is an LHRH agonist that is most commonly used in chemical castration today. This drug has been observed as having higher rates of success in reducing abnormal sexual urges and fantasies, but is often reserved for those offenders who are at a high risk of reoffending due to the drug's intense effects.

Psychotherapy has also recently been used in conjunction with chemical castration in order to maximize and prolong the beneficial results. Schober et al. reported in 2005 that when cognitive behavioral therapy combined with leuprolide acetetate was compared to cognitive behavioral therapy alone, the combination therapy produced a much more significant reduction of pedophilic fantasies and urges as well as masturbation. Chemical castration therapy reduces an individual's libido which then makes some offenders more responsive to the introduction of psychotherapy. This combination therapy is most often utilized in those who are at a high risk of offending.

Scientific critique
Spaying is observed to cause female animals to stop mating in the same way as castration causes male animals to stop mating. However, in animal species where females continue their mating behaviour after being spayed, the males also continue to mate after being castrated. So there are scientists who argue that it makes no biological sense to assume that any treatment that emulates castration would remove sex drive in men but not in women. These scientists argue that these observations, along with the fact that humans are animals and subject to evolution, show that it is flawed to think that male sexuality would be treatable by medication if female sexuality is not.

Some criminologists argue that the appearance of a lower recidivism rate in male sex offenders who take chemical castration treatment than in those who do not can be explained by factors other than biological effects of the medication. One hypothesis is that men who accept the negative effects of hormonal treatment in exchange for shorter prison sentence are distinct in that they value freedom from incarceration higher than men who rather stay in prison for a longer time than face the side effects of chemical castration. These criminologists explain apparently lower recidivism as an artifact of men who accept chemical castration being more engaged in hiding the evidence for reoffending, and that paroling such offenders constitute a risk of releasing criminals who commit as many new crimes as others but are better at hiding it. These criminologists also argue that police investigators treating castrated men as less likely to reoffend than non-castrated men may cause an investigation bias and self-fulfilling prophecy, and that men who sell some of their prescribed medicines on the black market for drugs get a hidden income that improves their ability to afford measures to hide recidivism that is not available to men without such prescriptions.

Some neurologists acknowledge that testosterone plays a role in sexual arousal but consider that reducing sex drive will likely not reduce inappropriate sex behaviour. These researchers argue that since a weaker internal signal in the brain means a higher requirement for external stimulation to create a feedback loop that tires the brain circuits out as in orgasm and lead to satisfaction, a reduction of the internal stimulation from hormones would make the required external stimulation stronger and also more specific, as weaker signals involve narrower ranges of other brain functions in their loops. These scientists therefore argue that the biological (as opposed to sociological) effect of reduced testosterone is to make it more difficult and not easier to use masturbation without pornography or other socially acceptable substitutes to manage remaining sex drive in a former offender, and that many community persons (both male and female) find that a lower initial arousal makes it more difficult to orgasm by masturbation without pornography or with non-preferred stimulation.

Chemical castration by country

Africa

South Africa
In July 2022, a proposed policy of chemical castration for rapists was introduced at the national policy conference of the ruling party, the African National Congress, by the party's Women's League.

Americas

Argentina
In March 2010, Guillermo Fontana of CNN reported that officials in Mendoza, a province in Argentina, approved the use of voluntary chemical castration for rapists, in return for reduced sentences.

United States
In 1966, John Money became the first American to employ chemical castration by prescribing medroxyprogesterone acetate (MPA, the base ingredient now used in DMPA) as a treatment for a patient dealing with pedophilic urges.  The drug has thereafter become a mainstay of chemical castration in America. Despite its long history and established use, the drug has never been approved by the FDA for use as a treatment for sexual offenders.

California was the first U.S. state to specify the use of chemical castration for repeat child molesters as a condition of their parole, following the passage of a modification to Section 645 of the California penal code in 1996. This law stipulates castration for anyone convicted of child molestation with a minor under 13 years of age if they are on parole after their second offense. Offenders may not reject the intervention, although they may elect surgical castration instead of ongoing DMPA injections.

The passage of this law led to similar laws in other states such as Florida's Statute Section 794.0235 which was passed into law in 1997. As in California, treatment is mandatory after a second offense.

At least seven other states, including Georgia, Iowa, Louisiana, Montana, Oregon, Texas and Wisconsin, have experimented with chemical castration. In Iowa, as in California and Florida, offenders may be sentenced to chemical castration in all cases involving serious sex offenses.  On June 25, 2008, following the Supreme Court ruling in Kennedy v. Louisiana that the execution of child rapists where the victim was not killed was ruled unconstitutional, Louisiana Governor Bobby Jindal signed Senate Bill 144, allowing Louisiana judges to sentence convicted rapists to chemical castration. Alabama passed such a law in 2019.

Asia

India
After the outrage following the gang rape of a woman in Delhi, the Government has submitted a draft proposing chemical castration along with an imprisonment of up to 30 years for rape convicts as part of the anti-rape law in India. The ministry is preparing a detailed bill and the recommended changes are under review.
Government is also planning to re-define the Juvenile Act and lower their age. One of the accused in the rape case is a juvenile and aged a few months less than 18 years. A view has been expressed by a section that only those below 15 years should be described as juvenile.

Indonesia
In 2016, the Indonesian President Joko Widodo introduced a presidential regulation (Government Regulation in Lieu of Law No.1/2016) to allow chemical castration to be handed down as a punishment to child sex offenders and pedophiles. The regulation alters the contents of the 2002 Law on Child Protection (Law No. 23 of 2002). DPR later enacted the regulation and amended the law (Law No. 17 of 2016) to enable chemical castration. Although, a convicted child sex offender convicted in 2019 and eligible to be castrated chemically, the technical details on how the punishment will be carried out was under debate between the Government and Indonesian Physicians Association, resulting the sentence suspended until the technical details made. On 7 December 2020, government finally issued Government Regulation No. 70/2020, that detailing technical details on how chemical castration carried out. The chemical castration punishment carried by specifically appointed physician in central government-run or local government-run hospital, and witnessed by witnesses from Attorney General, Ministry of Law and Human Rights, Ministry of Social Affairs, and Ministry of Health. The drugs used for the sentence however, not declared in the government regulation. The government regulation also authorized Ministry of Law and Human Rights to issue regulation to notify the Attorney General, and Ministry of Health to compile the technical procedure for the clinical assessment, conclusion, and implementation. As of January 2021, both derivative regulations not yet published and announced.

Israel
In May 2009, two brothers from Haifa—convicted child molesters—agreed to undergo chemical castration to avoid committing further crimes.

Pakistan 
In 2020, Pakistan's Prime Minister Imran Khan told a journalist that he would prefer that rapists and child molesters be publicly hanged, but he added that, because he imagined that such capital punishment would gain negative attention for Pakistan on the international stage, he would instead like such offenders to "undergo chemical castration, or surgery be performed so they cannot do anything in future." The Anti-Rape Ordinance 2020, approved by President Arif Alvi in December 2020, allows for chemical castration of rapists without the consent of the offender. Lawmakers gave it permanent approval in November 2021.

South Korea
In July 2011, South Korea enacted a law allowing judges the power to sentence sex offenders who have attacked children under the age of 16 to chemical castration. The law also allows for chemical castration to be ordered by a Ministry of Justice committee. On May 23, 2012, a serial sex offender legally called Park in the court case was ordered by the committee to undergo this treatment after his most recent attempted offense. On January 3, 2013, a South Korean court sentenced a 31-year-old man to 15 years in jail and chemical castration, the country's first-ever chemical castration sentence. In 2017, the sentencing was extended to include all forms of rapes and sexual assault cases against women, including attempted rape.

Europe
Legislation allowing chemical castration exists in France, the United Kingdom, Poland, Russia, North Macedonia, Belgium and Turkey. The drug cyproterone acetate has been commonly used for chemical castration throughout Europe.  It resembles the drug MPA used in America.

Estonia 
On June 5, 2012, Estonia passed a law that allows voluntary chemical castration as a part of complex treatment for less serious sex offenders as an alternative of imprisonment. However, the treatment is rarely used in practice.

Germany 
In the 1960s, German physicians used antiandrogens as a treatment for sexual paraphilia.

Moldova 
On March 6, 2012, Moldova legislated forcible chemical castration of child molesters; the law came into effect on July 1, 2012.

North Macedonia 
In October and November 2013, North Macedonia authorities were working on developing a legal framework and standard procedure for implementation of chemical castration that would be used for convicted child molesters. The castration is intended to be voluntarily, where as for the child molesters that repeat the criminal act it should be mandatory.

Poland 
On September 25, 2009, Poland legislated forcible chemical castration of child molesters. This law came into effect on June 9, 2010; therefore in Poland "anyone guilty of raping a child under the age of 15 can now be forced to submit to chemical and psychological therapy to reduce sex drive at the end of a prison term".

Portugal 
In 2008, an experimental intervention program was launched in three Portuguese prisons: Carregueira (Belas, Sintra), Paços de Ferreira and Funchal. The program developers note the voluntary nature of the program a crucial factor in its success. They initially planned to cover ten inmates per prison, contemplating a possible enlargement to other prisons in the future. The program also included a rehabilitation component.

Russia
In October 2011, the Russian parliament approved a law that allows a court-requested forensic psychiatrist to prescribe the chemical castration of convicted sex offenders who have harmed children under the age of 14.

United Kingdom 
In the United Kingdom, computer scientist Alan Turing, famous for his contributions to mathematics and computer science, pleaded guilty in 1952 to a charge of gross indecency for engaging in homosexual acts and accepted chemical castration as a term of his probation, thus avoiding imprisonment.  At the time, homosexual acts between males were illegal and homosexual orientation was widely considered to be a mental illness that could be treated with chemical castration.  Turing experienced side effects such as gynecomastia (breast enlargement) and bloating of the physique. He died two years later, with the inquest returning a verdict of suicide. In 2009 British Prime Minister Gordon Brown issued a public apology for the "appalling" treatment of Turing after an online petition gained 30,000 signatures and international recognition. He was given a posthumous Royal Pardon in December 2013.

A law allowing voluntary chemical castration was created in the UK in 2007 by then home secretary John Reid.

On April 30, 2010, a 30-year-old man in the United Kingdom found guilty of attempting to murder a 60-year-old woman in order to abduct and rape her two granddaughters (aged eight and two) agreed to undergo chemical castration as part of the terms of his sentence. He was jailed for a minimum of 10 years at the High Court in Glasgow.

Oceania

Australia
In 2010, a  58-year-old repeat child sex offender who had been subject to chemical castration was accused of inappropriately touching and kissing a seven-year-old young girl. He was found not guilty by a jury, which was not informed of the context of his previous offenses.

New Zealand 
In New Zealand, the antilibidinal drug cyproterone acetate is sold under the name Androcur. In November 2000 convicted child sex offender Robert Jason Dittmer attacked a victim while on the drug. In 2009 a study into the effectiveness of the drug by Dr David Wales for the Corrections Department found that no research had been conducted in New Zealand into the effectiveness and such trials were "ethically and practically very difficult to carry out."

Objections 
The American Civil Liberties Union of Florida opposes the administration of any drug that is dangerous or has significant irreversible effect as an alternative to incarceration; however, they do not oppose the use of antiandrogen drugs for sex offenders under carefully controlled circumstances as an alternative to incarceration.  Law professor John Stinneford has argued that chemical castration is a cruel and unusual punishment because it exerts control over the mind of sex offenders to render them incapable of sexual desire and subjects them to the physical changes caused by the hormones used.

Some people have argued that, based on the 14th Amendment, the procedure fails to guarantee equal protection: although the laws mandating the treatment do so without respect to gender, the actual effect of the procedure disproportionately falls upon men. In the case of voluntary statutes, the ability to give informed consent is also an issue; in 1984, the U.S. state of Michigan's court of appeals held that mandating chemical castration as a condition of probation was unlawful on the grounds that the drug medroxyprogesterone acetate had not yet gained acceptance as being safe and reliable and also due to the difficulty of obtaining informed consent under these circumstances.

Treatment of cancer
A major medical use of chemical castration is in the treatment of hormone-dependent cancers, such as some prostate cancer, where it has largely replaced the practice of surgical castration.

Chemical castration involves the administration of antiandrogen drugs, such as cyproterone acetate, flutamide, or gonadotropin-releasing hormone agonists.

See also
 Leuprorelin
 Neutersol
 Nonsurgical neutering alternatives
 Triptorelin

References

Further reading 
 
 
 

Castration
Men
Men's health
Punishments
Reproductive rights
State law in the United States
Mental health law